Antonio Bido (sometimes credited as Tony B. Dodd; born January 8, 1949) is an Italian film director.

Bido is known for such films as Watch Me When I Kill, Blue Tornado with Patsy Kensit, David Warner and Dirk Benedict, and The Bloodstained Shadow.

References

External links

Italian film directors
Giallo film directors
Horror film directors
1949 births
Living people